Harry Elbert "Cap" Trotter (October 18, 1890 – December 28, 1954) was an American football, basketball, and track and field coach.  He served as the head football the Southern Branch of the University of California—now known as the University of California, Los Angeles (UCLA)—from 1920 to 1922 and at Willamette University from 1943 to 1944, compiling a career college football record of 7–16–1. He was inducted into the Ventura County Sports Hall of Fame in 1989.

Coaching career
UCLA began to play in the Southern California Intercollegiate Athletic Conference (SCIAC) in 1920, and competed against Occidental College, California Institute of Technology, University of Redlands, Whittier College, and Pomona College. Coach Trotter's two wins were against Redlands and San Diego State University, which did not join the SCIAC until 1926.

Head coaching record

College football

References

External links
 

1890 births
1954 deaths
American male shot putters
Basketball coaches from California
UCLA Bruins football coaches
UCLA Bruins track and field coaches
USC Trojans men's track and field athletes
Willamette Bearcats football coaches
Willamette Bearcats men's basketball coaches
High school football coaches in California
People from Santa Paula, California
Sportspeople from Kansas City, Kansas
Track and field people from California